The Italy national football team represents the country of Italy in international association football. It is fielded by the Italian Football Federation, the governing body of football in Italy, and competes as a member of the Union of European Football Associations (UEFA), which encompasses the countries of Europe. Italy competed in their first official international football match on 15 May 1910, a 6–2 victory over France in Milan at Arena Civica.

Italy have competed in numerous competitions, and all players, either as a member of the starting eleven or as a substitute, are listed below. Each player's details include his playing position while with the team, the number of caps earned and goals scored in all international matches, the year of their first and last (or most recent) matches played in, as well as any major honours won, ordered alphabetically. All statistics are correct up to and including the match played on 20 November 2022. Players that are still active at the club and/or international level are in bold.

Key

List of players

References

External links
 Italy national football team player call-ups and appearances at FIGC.it
 PLAYERS: international footballers of the Italy national football team at Eu-football.info

 
Association football player non-biographical articles